Ugo Forno (Rome, 27 April 1932 – 5 June 1944) was an Italian student killed in Rome during World War II, while fighting against German invasion forces as a resistance fighter, during the defence of a railway bridge on the Aniene.
Known as "Ughetto," he was in second-grade at the time and died while German sappers attempted to destroy the bridge. The mission was successful, but mortar rounds killed Forno and other partisans. 

The bridge is now named after him.

References

 www.ugoforno.it 

1932 births
1944 deaths
Italian resistance movement members
Italian civilians killed in World War II
Child soldiers in World War II